Georgetown, Pennsylvania may refer to:

Georgetown, Beaver County, Pennsylvania
Georgetown, Lancaster County, Pennsylvania
Georgetown, Luzerne County, Pennsylvania